Ahmad Alaq; (1465 – 1504 winter) was the Khan of Eastern Moghulistan (Uyghurstan) from 1487 to 1504 and Khan of the Kyrgyz Khanate from 1484 to 1504. He was the second son of Yunus Khan. His mother was Shah Begum, fourth daughter of Badakhshan prince Lali.

Ahmad Alaq was a direct male-line descendant of Genghis Khan, through his son Chagatai Khan.

Life
During his father's lifetime Ahmad was behind several rebellions against him. When Yunus Khan took up residence in Tashkent in 1484, Ahmad and a large body of Moghuls fled to the steppes. In 1487, Ahmad's father died and was succeeded in the territory he still controlled by another son, Mahmud Khan.

Ahmad's reign was marked by conflicts with several of his neighbors. Conflict in the Ming Turpan Border Wars over Hami with the Ming Dynasty China resulted in an economic blockade of the region, which allowed the Chinese to eventually emerge victorious. A campaign against the Mirza Abu Bakr Dughlat, of the Dughlats of the South-West Tarim Basin, who were in theory vassals of the Moghul khans, resulted in the temporary acquisition of Kashgar in around 1499. In the same year he concluded Peace Agreement with Ming China that gave him opportunity to launch three expeditions against the Kalmyks in Northern part of Moghulistan ( Jettisu ), who occupied this region since reign of Esen Taishi and his son Amasanji Taishi .  Ahmad twice completely defeated them. Because he slaughtered many Kalmyks during these expeditions he was nicknamed   Alacha , i.e. Slaughterer.

In the early 16th century, Ahmad and Mahmud decided to counter the growing power of the Uzbeks under Muhammad Shaybani. The two brothers united the forces and launched a campaign against the Uzbeks, but Muhammad Shaybani proved victorious in battle and took them both prisoner (Babur also was among his uncles' army and participated in this battle in Ferghana Valley, that had turned into disaster, but managed to flee south and hide in mountains with his mother, Kutluk Nigar Khanum, daughter of Yunus Khan, and few followers). They were soon released, but Ahmad died shortly afterwards, in 1504. He was succeeded in Uyghurstan by his eldest son Mansur Khan.

Kyrgyz Khanate

The Kyrgyz Khanate that had developed on the territory of northern Kyrgyzstan was headed by Ahmad Alaq (1484-1504). The Kyrgyz tribal elites put Ahmad on the Khan's throne to legitimize their Khanate, so that all neighboring states would recognize him. Ahmad Khan staged a brutal massacre of all the tribes that were not obedient to him, such as Arlat and Kaluchi.

Family
Consorts
Sahib Daulat Begum, sister of Mir Jabar Bardi Dughlat, mother of Mansur Khan, Babajak Khan, Shah Shaikh Muhammad and Maham Khanum;
Mother of Said Khan, Aiman Khwajah Sultan, and Khadija Sultan Khanum;
Mother of Lad Shad Khanum, a concubine (umm walad);

Sons
According to Mirza Muhammad Haidar, Dughlat he had 19 sons total, most prominent of whom were:
Mansur Khan - ruler of eastern Moghulistan or Uyghurstan from 1504 to 1543  (included the cities Aksu, Uch Turpan, Bai, Kucha, Chalish or Karashahr, Turpan and Kumul).
Iskandar Sultan - who died soon after his father's death.
Sultan Said Khan - seized power from Dughlat Amirs' Dynasty of Yarkand state in 1514 (known at the time as Mamlakati Yarkand or Kashgar Emirate, included the cities of Kashgar, Yarkand, Yangihissar, Hotan and, for short periods, Aksu and Uch Turpan) in West Kashgaria. In 1516 the western and eastern parts of Kashgaria were united in one centralized state: Kashgar and Uyghurstan. Died in 1533 of asthma during a military expedition in Ursang ( Great Tibet ).
Babajak Sultan - was in service to Mansur Khan.
Shah Sheikh Muhammad Sultan - who together with his harem and children was killed by the fall of his palace during an earthquake.
Sultan Khalil Sultan - ruler of Kyrgyz Khanate from 1504 to 1508. He drowned in a river near Akhsi  in the Fergana Valley after he was captured by Uzbek sultans.
Aiman Khwajah Sultan - who had two sons, Khizr Khwaja Khan married to Gulbadan Begum, daughter of Emperor Babur and Dildar Begum, and Aq Sultan married to Habiba Begum, daughter of Kamran Mirza, son of Babur. 
Chin Temur Sultan - was in the service of both Sultan Said Khan and Mansur Khan, but eventually fled to join Babur in India. He died of dysentery in Agra and was buried there.
Isan Temur Sultan - fled from the service of Sultan Said Khan and Mansur Khan and joined Babur in India. Married in 1530 to Gulrang Begum, daughter of Emperor Babur and Dildar Begum.
Thukhta Bugha Sultan - married in 1530 to Gulchehra Begum, another daughter of Emperor Babur and Dildar Begum. He died in 1533.

Daughters
He had four daughters:
Lad Shad Khanum, married to Muhammad Amir Mirza Dughlat;
Maham Khanum, married to Builash Khan Uzbeg Kazak, son of Awiq;
Khadija Sultan Khanum, married firstly to Jahangir Mirza Dughlat, married secondly to Muhammad Sultan Chaghatai;
Muhib Sultan Khanum, married to Mirza Muhammad Haidar Dughlat;

Genealogy

Genealogy of Chughatai Khanates

In Babr Nama written by Babur, Page 19, Chapter 1; described genealogy of his maternal grandfather Yunas Khan as:

"Yunas Khan descended from Chaghatai Khan, the second
son of Chingiz Khan (as follows,) Yunas Khan, son of Wais
Khan, son of Sher-'ali Aughlon, son of Muhammad Khan, son
of Khizr Khwaja Khan, son of Tughluq-timur Khan, son of
Aisan-bugha Khan, son of Dawa Khan, son of Baraq Khan,
son of Yesuntawa Khan, son of Muatukan, son of Chaghatai
Khan, son of Chingiz Khan"

Chughtai Khanate

References

Mirza Muhammad Haidar Dughlat. Tarih-i-Rashidi ( History of Rashid ) or The history of Moghuls. Written in Kashmir in Chagatai language in 1541-February,1547. Translated by Edward Denison Ross. London, 1895. , 
M.Kutlukov. About emergence of the Yarkand State. Almaty, 1990

1504 deaths
Chagatai khans
Uyghurs
Year of birth unknown